Michael Therriault is a Canadian actor. He attended Etobicoke School of the Arts in Toronto, Sheridan College in Oakville, and was a member of the inaugural season of the Birmingham Conservatory for Classical Theatre Training in Stratford, Ontario.

Life and career
After spending seven seasons at the Stratford Festival, Therriault left the classical repertoire theatre for musical theatre, starring as Leopold Bloom in the short-lived Toronto production of The Producers. For the performance Therriault won a Dora Award for Principal Actor in a Musical.

In 2006, Therriault portrayed Tommy Douglas in the CBC Television special Prairie Giant: The Tommy Douglas Story. He was subsequently nominated for a Gemini Award for Best Performance by an Actor in a Leading Role in a Dramatic Program or Mini-Series. The show received a total of nine nominations, including Best Writing in a Dramatic Program or Mini-Series and Best Dramatic Mini-Series.  However, it was also heavily criticised for its historical inaccuracies, leading the CBC to pull it from future broadcasts.

While on Broadway in a revival of Fiddler on the Roof, Therriault got news that he had secured the role of Gollum in the Toronto premiere of The Lord of the Rings: The Musical. He received his second Dora for the performance.

When it closed, he returned to Saskatchewan to film the made-for-television adaptation of Guy Vanderhaeghe's The Englishman's Boy (it aired in two parts on March 2 and 9, 2008, and is now available on DVD).

In May 2007, The Lord of the Rings moved to London, with Therriault reprising the role he originated.  The production closed on July 19, 2008, after 492 performances.

On Monday, October 20, 2008, Therriault took part in a tribute to the late Richard Monette, former artistic director of the Stratford Shakespeare Festival.

Therriault performed in The Sound of Silence, a tribute to Paul Simon at the Bathurst Street Theatre in Toronto on April 20, 2009.

On April 27, 2009, it was announced that Therriault will appear as Irving Berlin, alongside Michael Boatman as Scott Joplin, in The Tin Pan Alley Rag, which centers around the imagined meeting of the two great musicians.  The Tin Pan Alley Rag is presented by Roundabout Theatre Company in New York, June 12 to September 6, 2009.

Stratford Shakespeare Festival credits

Peter Pan (2010)—Peter Pan
Quiet in the Land (2003)—Yock Bauman
Pericles, Prince of Tyre (2003)—Boult
The Hunchback of Notre Dame (2003)—Jehan
The Two Noble Kinsmen (2002)—Doctor/Schoolmaster/Speaker
King Henry VI, Reign of Terror (2002)—King Henry VI
King Henry VI, Revolt in England (2002)—King Henry VI
King Henry VI, Revenge in France (2002)—King Henry VI
The Seagull (2001)—Konstantin'
Henry V (2001)—Montjoy
Twelfth Night (2001)—Sir Andrew Aguecheek
As You Like It (2000)—Silvius
Fiddler on the Roof (2000)—Motel
Oscar Remembered (2000)—Lord Alfred Douglas
The Alchemist (1999)—Drugger
The Tempest (1999)—Ariel
A Midsummer Night's Dream (1999)—Francis Flute
The Miser (1998)—Cleante
Much Ado About Nothing (1998)—George Seacole
Julius Caesar (1998)—Lucius
Filumena (1997)—Umbreto
The Taming of the Shrew (1997)—Pietro
Camelot (1997)—Mordred

Other credits

Cult of Chucky, (2017) - Dr. Foley
Me and My Girl, Shaw Festival, (2017) - Bill Snibson
 Halcyon — Blake Creighton (2016)
 Reign – Lord Castleroy, 2013–2017
Parade, The Canadian Stage Company, (2011)- Leo Frank
Tin Pan Alley Rag, Roundabout Theatre Company (2009)—Irving Berlin
Jitters, Manitoba Theatre Centre (2009)—George Ellsworth
The Englishman's Boy, CBC Television (2008)—Harry Vincent
The Lord of the Rings, Theatre Royal, Drury Lane, London (2007)—Gollum
The Lord of the Rings, Princess of Wales Theatre, Toronto (2006)—Gollum
Prairie Giant: The Tommy Douglas Story, CBC Television (2006)—Tommy Douglas
The Producers, Canon Theatre, Toronto (2003)—Leo Bloom

See also
Stratford Shakespeare Festival

Sources

Via Destinations article, August 2006 
Now Magazine article, March 2006 
  Star! Bio
Playbill article, September 2003 
 Offstage, Onstage: Inside the Stratford Festival, a documentary made over the course of the 2001 Season

References

External links

Living people
Canadian male stage actors
Canadian male film actors
Canadian male television actors
Canadian male voice actors
Dora Mavor Moore Award winners
People from Oakville, Ontario
Sheridan College alumni
Male actors from Ontario
21st-century Canadian male actors
20th-century Canadian male actors
1977 births